In music, a note is the representation of a musical sound.

Notes can represent the pitch and duration of a sound in musical notation. A note can also represent a pitch class.

Notes are the building blocks of much written music: discretizations of musical phenomena that facilitate performance, comprehension, and analysis.

The term note can be used in both generic and specific senses: one might say either "the piece 'Happy Birthday to You' begins with two notes having the same pitch", or "the piece begins with two repetitions of the same note". In the former case, one uses note to refer to a specific musical event; in the latter, one uses the term to refer to a class of events sharing the same pitch. (See also: Key signature names and translations.)

Two notes with fundamental frequencies in a ratio equal to any integer power of two (e.g., half, twice, or four times) are perceived as very similar. Because of that, all notes with these kinds of relations can be grouped under the same pitch class.

In European music theory, most countries use the solfège naming convention do–re–mi–fa–sol–la–si, including for instance Italy, Portugal, Spain, France, Romania, most Latin American countries, Greece, Albania, Bulgaria, Turkey, Russia, Arabic-speaking and Persian-speaking countries. However, in English- and Dutch-speaking regions, pitch classes are typically represented by the first seven letters of the Latin alphabet (A, B, C, D, E, F and G). Several European countries, including Germany, adopt an almost identical notation, in which H is substituted for B (see below for details). Byzantium used the names Pa–Vu–Ga–Di–Ke–Zo–Ni (Πα–Βου–Γα–Δι–Κε–Ζω–Νη).

In traditional Indian music, musical notes are called svaras and commonly represented using the seven notes, Sa, Re, Ga, Ma, Pa, Dha and Ni.

The eighth note, or octave, is given the same name as the first, but has double its frequency (first harmonic). The name octave is also used to indicate the span between a note and another with double frequency. To differentiate two notes that have the same pitch class but fall into different octaves, the system of scientific pitch notation combines a letter name with an Arabic numeral designating a specific octave. For example, the now-standard tuning pitch for most Western music, 440 Hz, is named a′ or A4.

There are two formal systems to define each note and octave, the Helmholtz pitch notation and the scientific pitch notation.

Accidentals 

Letter names are modified by the accidentals. The sharp sign  raises a note by a semitone or half-step, and a flat  lowers it by the same amount. The accidentals are written after the note name: so, for example, F represents F-sharp, B is B-flat, and C is C natural (or C).

Additional accidentals are the double-sharp , raising the frequency by two semitones, and double-flat , lowering it by that amount.

In musical notation, accidentals are placed before the note symbols. Systematic alterations to the seven lettered pitches in the scale can be indicated by placing the symbols in the key signature, which then apply implicitly to all occurrences of corresponding notes. Explicitly noted accidentals can be used to override this effect for the remainder of a bar. A special accidental, the natural symbol , is used to indicate a pitch unmodified by the alterations in the key signature. Effects of key signature and local accidentals do not accumulate. If the key signature indicates G, a local flat before a G makes it G (not G), though often this type of rare accidental is expressed as a natural, followed by a flat to make this clear. Likewise (and more commonly), a double sharp  sign on a key signature with a single sharp  indicates only a double sharp, not a triple sharp.

Assuming enharmonicity, many accidentals will create equivalences between pitches that are written differently. For instance, raising the note B to B is equal to the note C. Assuming all such equivalences, the complete chromatic scale adds five additional pitch classes to the original seven lettered notes for a total of 12 (the 13th note completing the octave), each separated by a half-step.

Notes that belong to the diatonic scale relevant in the context are sometimes called diatonic notes; notes that do not meet that criterion are then sometimes called chromatic notes.

Another style of notation, rarely used in English, uses the suffix "is" to indicate a sharp and "es" (only "s" after A and E) for a flat, e.g., Fis for F, Ges for G, Es for E. This system first arose in Germany and is used in almost all European countries whose main language is not English, Greek, or a Romance language (such as French, Portuguese, Spanish, Italian, and Romanian).

In most countries using these suffixes, the letter H is used to represent what is B natural in English, the letter B is used instead of B, and Heses (i.e., H) is used instead of B (although Bes and Heses both denote the English B). Dutch-speakers in Belgium and the Netherlands use the same suffixes, but applied throughout to the notes A to G, so that B, B and B have the same meaning as in English, although they are called B, Bes, and Beses instead of B, B flat and B double flat. Denmark also uses H, but uses Bes instead of Heses for B.

12-tone chromatic scale

The following chart lists the names used in different countries for the 12 notes of a chromatic scale built on C. The corresponding symbols are shown within parenthesis. Differences between German and English notation are highlighted in bold typeface. Although the English and Dutch names are different, the corresponding symbols are identical.

Note designation in accordance with octave name 

The table below shows each octave and the frequencies for every note of pitch class A. The traditional (Helmholtz) system centers on the great octave (with capital letters) and small octave (with lower case letters). Lower octaves are named "contra" (with primes before), higher ones "lined" (with primes after). Another system (scientific) suffixes a number (starting with 0, or sometimes −1). In this system A4 is nowadays standardised at 440 Hz, lying in the octave containing notes from C4 (middle C) to B4. The lowest note on most pianos is A0, the highest C8. The MIDI system for electronic musical instruments and computers uses a straight count starting with note 0 for C−1 at 8.1758 Hz up to note 127 for G9 at 12,544 Hz.

Written notes 
A written note can also have a note value, a code that determines the note's relative duration. In order of halving duration, they are: double note (breve); whole note (semibreve); half note (minim); quarter note (crotchet); eighth note (quaver); sixteenth note (semiquaver); thirty-second note (demisemiquaver), sixty-fourth note (hemidemisemiquaver), and hundred twenty-eighth note.

In a score, each note is assigned a specific vertical position on a staff position (a line or space) on the staff, as determined by the clef. Each line or space is assigned a note name. These names are memorized by musicians and allow them to know at a glance the proper pitch to play on their instruments.

The staff above shows the notes C, D, E, F, G, A, B, C and then in reverse order, with no key signature or accidentals.

Note frequency (in hertz) 

Music can be composed of notes at any arbitrary physical frequency. Since the physical causes of music are vibrations, they are often measured in hertz (Hz), with 1 Hz meaning one vibration per second. For historical and other reasons, especially in Western music, only twelve notes of fixed frequencies are used. These fixed frequencies are mathematically related to each other, and are defined around the central note, A4. The current "standard pitch" or modern "concert pitch" for this note is 440 Hz, although this varies in actual practice (see History of pitch standards).

The note-naming convention specifies a letter, any accidentals, and an octave number. Each note is an integer number of half-steps away from concert A (A4). Let this distance be denoted . If the note is above A4, then  is positive; if it is below A4, then  is negative. The frequency of the note (assuming equal temperament) is then:

For example, one can find the frequency of C5, the first C above A4. There are 3 half-steps between A4 and C5 (A4 → A4 → B4 → C5), and the note is above A4, so  = 3. The note's frequency is:

For example, the F below A4 is F4. There are 4 half-steps (A4 → A4 → G4 → G4 → F4), and the note is below A4, so  = −4. The note's frequency is:

Finally, it can be seen from this formula that octaves automatically yield powers of two times the original frequency, since  is a multiple of 12 (12, where  is the number of octaves up or down), and so the formula reduces to:

yielding a factor of 2. In fact, this is the means by which this formula is derived, combined with the notion of equally-spaced intervals.

The distance of an equally tempered semitone is divided into 100 cents. So 1200 cents are equal to one octave – a frequency ratio of 2:1.

For use with the MIDI (Musical Instrument Digital Interface) standard, a frequency mapping is defined by:

where  is the MIDI note number (and 69 is the number of semitones between C−1 (note 0) and A4). And in the opposite direction, to obtain the frequency from a MIDI note , the formula is defined as:

For notes in an A440 equal temperament, this formula delivers the standard MIDI note number. Any other frequencies fill the space between the whole numbers evenly. This lets MIDI instruments be tuned accurately in any microtuning scale, including non-western traditional tunings.

Note names and their history 
Music notation systems have used letters of the alphabet for centuries. The 6th-century philosopher Boethius is known to have used the first fourteen letters of the classical Latin alphabet (the letter J did not exist until the 16th century),
A B C D E F G H I K L M N O,
to signify the notes of the two-octave range that was in use at the time and in modern scientific pitch notation are represented as
A2 B2 C3 D3 E3 F3 G3 A3 B3 C4 D4 E4 F4 G4.

Though it is not known whether this was his devising or common usage at the time, this is nonetheless called Boethian notation. Although Boethius is the first author known to use this nomenclature in the literature, Ptolemy wrote of the two-octave range five centuries before, calling it the perfect system or complete system – as opposed to other, smaller-range note systems that did not contain all possible species of octave (i.e., the seven octaves starting from A, B, C, D, E, F, and G).

Following this, the range (or compass) of used notes was extended to three octaves, and the system of repeating letters A–G in each octave was introduced, these being written as lower-case for the second octave (a–g) and double lower-case letters for the third (aa–gg). When the range was extended down by one note, to a G, that note was denoted using the Greek letter gamma (Γ). (It is from this that the French word for scale, gamme derives, and the English word gamut, from "Gamma-Ut", the lowest note in Medieval music notation.)

The remaining five notes of the chromatic scale (the black keys on a piano keyboard) were added gradually; the first being B, since B was flattened in certain modes to avoid the dissonant tritone interval. This change was not always shown in notation, but when written, B (B-flat) was written as a Latin, round "b", and B (B-natural) a Gothic script (known as Blackletter) or "hard-edged" b. These evolved into the modern flat and natural symbols respectively. The sharp symbol arose from a barred b, called the "cancelled b".

In parts of Europe, including Germany, the Czech Republic, Slovakia, Poland, Hungary, Norway, Denmark, Serbia, Croatia, Slovenia, Finland and Iceland (and Sweden before the 1990s), the Gothic b transformed into the letter H (possibly for hart, German for hard, or just because the Gothic b resembled an H). Therefore, in German music notation, H is used instead of B (B-natural), and B instead of B (B-flat). Occasionally, music written in German for international use will use H for B-natural and Bb for B-flat (with a modern-script lower-case b instead of a flat sign). Since a Bes or B in Northern Europe (i.e., a B elsewhere) is both rare and unorthodox (more likely to be expressed as Heses), it is generally clear what this notation means.

In Italian, Portuguese, Spanish, French, Romanian, Greek, Albanian, Russian, Mongolian, Flemish, Persian, Arabic, Hebrew, Ukrainian, Bulgarian, Turkish and Vietnamese the note names are do–re–mi–fa–sol–la–si rather than C–D–E–F–G–A–B. These names follow the original names reputedly given by Guido d'Arezzo, who had taken them from the first syllables of the first six musical phrases of a Gregorian chant melody "Ut queant laxis", which began on the appropriate scale degrees. These became the basis of the solfège system. For ease of singing, the name ut was largely replaced by do (most likely from the beginning of Dominus, Lord), though ut is still used in some places. It was the Italian musicologist and humanist Giovanni Battista Doni (1595–1647) who successfully proposed to rename the note "Ut" to "Do". For the seventh degree, the name si (from Sancte Iohannes, St. John, to whom the hymn is dedicated), though in some regions the seventh is named ti.

The two notation systems most commonly used today are the Helmholtz pitch notation system and the scientific pitch notation system. As shown in the table above, they both include several octaves, each starting from C rather than A. The reason is that the most commonly used scale in Western music is the major scale, and the sequence C–D–E–F–G–A–B–C (the C major scale) is the simplest example of a major scale. Indeed, it is the only major scale that can be obtained using natural notes (the white keys on the piano keyboard) and is typically the first musical scale taught in music schools.

In a newly developed system, primarily in use in the United States, notes of scales become independent of music notation. In this system the natural symbols C–D–E–F–G–A–B refer to the absolute notes, while the names do–re–mi–fa–so–la–ti are relativized and show only the relationship between pitches, where do is the name of the base pitch of the scale (the tonic), re is the name of the second degree, etc. The idea of this so-called "movable do," first suggested by John Curwen in the 19th century, was fully developed and involved into a whole educational system by Zoltán Kodály in the middle of the 20th century, which system is known as the Kodály method or Kodály concept.

See also 
Ghost note
Grace note
Letter notation
Musical tone
Pensato
Shape note
Universal key

References

Bibliography

External links 

Converter: Frequencies to note name, ± cents
Note names, keyboard positions, frequencies and MIDI numbers
Music notation systems − Frequencies of equal temperament tuning – The English and American system versus the German system
Frequencies of musical notes
Learn How to Read Sheet Music
Free music paper for printing and downloading

Musical notation